The Midalja għall-Qlubija (Medal for Bravery) is a medal of the Republic of Malta. The medal is awarded by the President of Malta, with the written approval of the Prime Minister of Malta, for exceptional acts of bravery. The award is presented to Maltese citizens but may be awarded to foreigners on an honorary basis for acts which merit recognition by Malta. The medal may be awarded posthumously.

Recipients of the medal are entitled to use the post-nominal M.R.Q.

Appearance
The Midalja għall-Qlubija is a silver medal  in diameter. In the first type, the obverse bears the Coat of Arms of Malta used between 1975 and 1988 superimposed over a 48 ray sunburst design. The second type changed the emblem for the Coat of Arms of Malta in 1988. The reverse depicts, in relief, a map of the Maltese Islands. The map is surrounded by a wreath. Below the wreath is the inscription Għall-Qlubija (For Bravery). Like the obverse, the reverse is also superimposed over a 48 ray sunburst design. The medal hangs from a bar suspension with the inscription 1975. When worn by a lady, the ribbon is fashioned into a bow.

Recipients
From its creation in 1975 until 2016, eight medals have been awarded:
PC Raymond Bonnici, M.R.Q. (1997)
Ivan Ciantar, M.R.Q. (posthumously) (1997)
PC Roger Debattista, M.R.Q. (posthumously) (2001)
Mario Azzopardi, M.R.Q (2002)
Richard Bates, M.R.Q. (2006)
SSgt. Roger Mulvaney, M.R.Q. (2007)
James Muscat, M.R.Q. (2009)
Karl Curmi, M.R.Q. (2015)

See also
 Orders, decorations, and medals of Malta

References

Orders, decorations, and medals of Malta
Courage awards